Hipócrita may refer to:

Hipocrita, moth
Hipócrita (film), 1949 Mexican film
Los Hipócritas, 1965 Argentine film
Hipócrita, a 1985 album by Lorenzo de Monteclaro
"Hipócrita", a 2018 song by Anuel AA featuring Zion